Strombidae, commonly known as the true conchs, is a taxonomic family of medium-sized to very large sea snails in the superfamily Stromboidea, and the Epifamily Neostromboidae. The term true conchs, being a common name, does not have an exact meaning. It may refer generally to any of the Strombidae but sometimes is used more specifically to include only Strombus and Lambis. The family currently includes 26 extant, and 10 extinct genera.

Distribution

Strombid gastropods live mainly in tropical and subtropical waters. These animals are widespread in the Indo-West Pacific, where most species and genera occur.  Nearly 40 of the living species that used to belong to the genus Strombus can be found in the Indo-Pacific region. They also occur in the eastern Pacific and Western Atlantic, and a single species can be found on the African Atlantic coast. Six species of strombids are found in the wider Caribbean region, including the queen conch Aliger gigas, the goliath conch Titanostrombus goliath, the hawk-wing conch Lobatus raninus, the rooster tail conch Aliger gallus, the milk conch Macrostrombus costatus, the West Indian fighting conch Strombus pugilis, and the Florida fighting conch Strombus alatus. Until recently, all of these species were placed in the genus Strombus, but now many species are being moved into new genera.

Morphology and life habits
Strombids have long eye stalks. The shell of a strombid has a long and narrow aperture and a siphonal canal. The shell margin has an indentation near the anterior end which accommodates one of the eye stalks. This indentation is called a strombid or stromboid notch. The stromboid notch may be more or less conspicuous, depending on the species. The shells of most species in this family grow a flared lip upon reaching sexual maturity, and they lay eggs in long, gelatinous strands. The genera Strombus and Lambis have many similarities between them, both anatomical and reproductive, though their shells show some conspicuous differences.

Strombids were widely accepted as carnivores by several authors in the 19th century, an erroneous concept that persisted for several decades into the first half of the 20th century. This ideology was probably born in the writings of Lamarck, who classified strombids alongside other supposedly carnivorous snails, and was copied in this by subsequent authors. However, the many claims of those authors were never supported by the observation of animals feeding in their natural habitat. Nowadays, strombids are known to be specialized herbivores and occasional detritivores. They are usually associated with shallow-water reefs and seagrass meadows.

Behavior
Unlike most snails, which glide slowly across the substrate on their feet, strombid gastropods have a characteristic means of locomotion, using their pointed, sickle-shaped, horny operculum to propel themselves forward in a so-called leaping motion.

Burrowing behavior, in which an individual sinks itself entirely or partially into the substrate, is also frequent among strombid gastropods. The burrowing process itself, which involves distinct sequential movements and sometimes complex behaviors, is very characteristic of each species. Usually, large strombid gastropods, such as the queen conch Eustrombus gigas and the spider conch Lambis lambis, do not bury themselves, except during their juvenile stages. However, smaller species such as Strombus canarium and Strombus epidromis may bury themselves even after adulthood.

Taxonomy
For a long time, all conchs and their allies (the strombids) were classified in only two genera, namely Strombus and Lambis. This classification can still be found in many textbooks and on websites on the internet. Based on molecular phylogeny in addition to an extensively documented fossil record, both genera have been subdivided into several new genera by different authors.

Genera
The family Strombidae actually comprises 26 extant genera and 10 extinct genera (marked with a dagger †).
Extant genera

Extinct genera
 
Genera brought into synonymy
 Afristrombus Bandel, 2007 is a synonym of Persististrombus Kronenberg & Lee, 2007
 Aliger Thiele, 1929 is a synonym of Lobatus Swainson, 1837
 Decostrombus Bandel, 2007 is a synonym of Conomurex Bayle in P. Fischer, 1884
 Eustrombus Wenz, 1940 is a synonym of Lobatus Swainson, 1837
 Fusistrombus Bandel, 2007 is a synonym of Canarium Schumacher, 1817
 Gallinula Mörch, 1852 is a synonym of Labiostrombus Oostingh, 1925
 Hawaiistrombus Bandel, 2007 is a synonym of Canarium Schumacher, 1817
 Heptadactylus Mörch, 1852 is a synonym of Lambis Röding, 1798
 Latissistrombus Bandel, 2007 is a synonym of Sinustrombus Bandel, 2007
 Millipes Mörch, 1852 is a synonym of Lambis Röding, 1798
 Ministrombus Bandel, 2007 is a synonym of Dolomena Wenz, 1940
 Monodactylus Mörch, 1852 is a synonym of Euprotomus Gill, 1870
 Margistrombus Bandel, 2007  is a synonym of Neodilatilabrum Dekkers, 2008
 Pterocera Lamarck, 1799 is a synonym of Lambis Röding, 1798
 Pyramis Röding, 1798 is a synonym of Strombus Linnaeus, 1758
 Solidistrombus Dekkers, 2008 is a synonym of Sinustrombus Bandel, 2007
 Strombella Schlüter, 1838 is a synonym of Strombus Linnaeus, 1758
 Strombidea Swainson, 1840 is a synonym of Canarium Schumacher, 1817

Phylogeny

The most recent revision of Maxwell 2019 (ZooKeys 867:1-7) new crown clade Neostromboidae to separate the Strombidae, Rostellariidae, and Seraphsidae from their sister families Struthiolariidae and Aporrhaidae. There is significant value to understanding evolutionary processes within Stromboidea to recognise the universal similarity in the position of the eye on the end of peduncles and a diminished cephalic tentacle that arises from the middle to the end on that peduncle. This is in contrast to other members of the Stromboidea where the eye is located at the base of the cephalic tentacle. These physiological differences represent two set of organisms with divergent and independent evolutionary life histories and therefore these differences need to be identifiable within the nomenclature to bring meaning to the way we name things.new crown clade Neostromboidae to separate the Strombidae, Rostellariidae, and Seraphsidae from their sister families Struthiolariidae and Aporrhaidae. There is significant value to understanding evolutionary processes within Stromboidea to recognise the universal similarity in the position of the eye on the end of peduncles and a diminished cephalic tentacle that arises from the middle to the end on that peduncle. This is in contrast to other members of the Stromboidea where the eye is located at the base of the cephalic tentacle. (from Maxwell et al. 2019) (https://www.researchgate.net/publication/334746905_Recognising_and_defining_a_new_crown_clade_within_Stromboidea_Rafinesque_1815_Mollusca_Gastropoda)

Historically the phylogenetic relationships among the Strombidae have been mainly accessed on two occasions, using two methods. In a 2005 monograph, Simone proposed a cladogram (a tree of descent) based on an extensive morphoanatomical analysis of representatives of the Aporrhaidae, Strombidae, Xenophoridae, and Struthiolariidae. In his analysis, Simone recognized the Strombidae as a monophyletic taxon supported by 13 synapomorphies (traits that are shared by two or more taxa and their most recent common ancestor), comprising at least eight distinct genera. He considered the genus Terebellum as the most basal taxon, distinguished from the remaining strombids by 13 synapomorphies, including a rounded foot. Though the genus Tibia was left out of the analysis, Simone regarded it as probably closely related to Terebellum, apparently due to some well known morphological similarities between them. With the exception of Lambis, the remaining taxa were previously allocated within the genus Strombus. However, according to Simone, only Strombus gracilior, Strombus alatus, and Strombus pugilis, the type species, remained within Strombus, as they constituted a distinct group based on at least five synapomorphies. The remaining taxa were previously considered as subgenera, and were elevated to genus level by Simone in the end of his analysis. The genus Eustrombus (now considered a synonym of Lobatus), in this case, included Eustrombus gigas (now considered a synonym of Lobatus gigas) and Eustrombus goliath (= Lobatus goliath); similarly, the genus Aliger included Aliger costatus (= Lobatus costatus) and Aliger gallus (= Lobatus gallus).

A different approach, this time based on sequences of nuclear histone H3 and mitochondrial cytochrome-c oxidase I (COI) genes was proposed by Latiolais and colleagues in a 2006 paper. The analysis included 32 strombid species that used to, or still belong in the genera Strombus and Lambis.

Human use
Snails in the family Strombidae are used by humans in a wide range of ways, mostly as food or decoration. Several species belonging to numerous genera among the Strombidae are considered economically important. Some species have been used in human culture for centuries. Since before the Age of Discovery, strombid shells were used as wind instruments, and were later used in the lime industry, in handicrafts, as souvenirs, and even in jewelry. In the Caribbean, Bermuda and southeastern United States, the queen conch Aliger gigas is sought after for its conch pearls, which have been used in jewelry since the Victorian era.

References

Further reading
 Roy K. (1996). "The roles of mass extinction and biotic interaction in large-scale replacements: a reexamination using the fossil record of stromboidean gastropods". Paleobiology 22(3): 436–452. pdf JSTOR
 Roy K., Balch D. P. & Hellberg M. E. (2001). "Spatial patterns of morphological diversity across the Indo-Pacific: analyses using strombid gastropods". Proceedings of the Royal Society B 268: 2503–2508. . PDF

External links

 Gastropoda Stromboidea - Ulrich Wieneke and Han Stoutjesdijk
 Worldwide Conchology Strombidae
 Strombidae Lambis Eye - photographs 
 The difference between a conch and a whelk 

 
Stromboidea
Taxa named by Constantine Samuel Rafinesque
Gastropod families